Tufton Warren is a hamlet close to the town of Whitchurch, Hampshire, England. It is in the civil parish of Hurstbourne Priors.

Accessing Tufton Warren is quite unusual, mainly because it is only accessible directly from a dual-carriageway, in this case being the A34. A crossroad-style junction formed of a gap in the central reservation leads to Tufton Warren in one direction, and Firgo in the other.

Villages in Hampshire